Wolfgang Petrick (born 12 January 1939, Berlin, Germany) is a German artist.

Biography
From 1958 to 1965 Petrick completed a course of studies in biology at the Freie Universität Berlin and in art at the Hochschule der Künste (HdK) as a master scholar with Werner Volkert. From 1975 to 2007 he was a professor at the HdK, and he has been a member of the Academy of Arts, Berlin in Berlin since 1993. He lives and works in Berlin and, since 1994, has also been working in New York.

Together with Karl Horst Hödicke, Markus Lüpertz, Peter Sorge and others, Petrick founded in 1965 in Berlin the exhibition association "Großgörschen 35", Germany's first self-help gallery (a producers' gallery in the present day sense). Years later as a "Kritischer Realist" he belonged to the group "Aspekt".

His initial creative work primarily concentrated on painting, drawing, sculpture, and graphic arts and prints. Since 2000 he has also worked in photography. He has been designing books since 2003 and has so far worked in collaboration with the authors Hans Christoph Buch (Morovia, Mon Amour) and Bora Ćosić (Alaska).

Works
Works 1962-1979, Zeichnungen, Bilder, Objekte, Druckgraphik. Exhibition Catalog, Neuer Berliner Kunstverein, Berlin 1979.
1962-1989: Sprung durch die Sonne. Exhibition Catalog, Esslingen (Villa Merkel), Hamburg, Hamburger Kunsthalle, 1989, .
Narziss. Exhibition Catalog, Raab-Galerie. Berlin 1995, .
Malerei und Material. Exhibition Catalog, Haus am Lützowplatz, Berlin 1999.
Batteria-GlasBau-Raum-Objekt-Drawing. Exhibition Catalog, Akademie der Künste, Berlin 2000.
Deep-Action. Wolfgang Petrick and Meisterschüler. Exhibition Catalog, Georg Kolbe Museum, Berlin 2005.
Good Slave-Bad Master. Exhibition Catalog, Galerie Michael Schultz, Berlin 2006.
Mutatio.  Exhibitions Catalog, Sara Asperger Gallery, Berlin 2008.

Literature
Peter Sager: Neue Formen des Realismus Kunst Zwischen Illusion und Wirklichkeit. Dumont, Köln 1977, .

External links
 Wolfgang Petrick's Website
 Wolfgang Petrick and Master Scholars (grand retrospective)
 Galleries, Exhibitions
 
 
 Additional bibliography

Academic staff of the Berlin University of the Arts
20th-century German painters
20th-century German male artists
German male painters
21st-century German painters
21st-century German male artists
Members of the Academy of Arts, Berlin
1939 births
Living people